The National Basketball League (NBL) Grand Final is the championship series at the conclusion of the NBL to determine the NBL champion. Between 1979 and 1986, the league used a single game to determine the champion. From 1986 to 2003, the league used a best-of-three series format. The 2004 series saw a switch a to best-of-five format. In 2010, the series reverted back to a best-of-three format once again until 2017 when it switched back to best-of-five. The Perth Wildcats hold the record for the most championships, having won 10 grand finals.

Champions

Legend

NBL champions

Results by teams 

† indicates club is not a current member of the NBL.

See also

 NBL Finals
 NBL Grand Final

References

External links 
 NBL Past Champions at aussiedigest.com
 National Basketball League champions at espn.com.au

champions
NBL champions
NBL